Valerie Miner (born in New York City) is an American novelist, journalist, and professor. A dual US/UK citizen, she lives in San Francisco and Mendocino, California with her partner.

Biography
Miner is the award-winning author of fifteen books. Bread and Salt is her fourth collection of stories. Her latest novel is Traveling with Spirits. Other novels include After Eden, Range of Light, A Walking Fire, Winter's Edge, Blood Sisters, All Good Women, Movement: A Novel in Stories and Murder in the English Department. Her short fiction books include Abundant Light, The Night Singers and Trespassing. Her collection of essays is Rumors from the Cauldron: Selected Essays, Reviews and Reportage. In 2002, The Low Road: A Scottish Family Memoir was a finalist for the PEN USA Creative Non-Fiction Award.  Her short fiction collections, Trespassing and Abundant Light were each finalists for the Lambda Literary Awards (1990 and 2005).

Miner's work has appeared in The Georgia Review, TriQuarterly, Salmagundi, New Letters, Ploughshares, The Village Voice, Prairie Schooner, The Gettysburg Review, The T.L.S., The Women's Review of Books, The Nation and other journals. Her stories and essays are published in more than sixty anthologies. A number of her pieces have been dramatized on BBC Radio 4. Her work has been translated into German, Turkish, Danish, Italian, Spanish, French, Swedish and Dutch.  In addition to single-authored projects, she has collaborated on books, museum exhibits as well as theater.

She has won fellowships and awards from The Rockefeller Foundation, Fondazione Bogliasco, The McKnight Foundation, The NEA, The Jerome Foundation, The Heinz Foundation, The Australia Council Literary Arts Board and numerous other sources. She has received Fulbright Fellowships to Tunisia, India and Indonesia.

Winner of a distinguished teaching award, she has taught for over twenty-five years and is now a professor and artist in residence at Stanford University.  She travels internationally giving readings, lectures, and workshops.  She and her partner live in San Francisco and Mendocino County, California.

References

External links
 

Living people
20th-century American novelists
21st-century American novelists
American women novelists
American lesbian writers
American LGBT novelists
American women journalists
20th-century American women writers
21st-century American women writers
Journalists from New York City
Novelists from New York (state)
20th-century American non-fiction writers
21st-century American non-fiction writers
American feminist writers
Year of birth missing (living people)